Caretta is an unincorporated community located in McDowell County, West Virginia, United States. Caretta was named for the transposed syllables in the name of Mrs. Etta Carter, the wife of George Lafayette Carter. It is the only place in the United States with this name.

This coal town was originally owned first by The Virginia Pocahontas Coal Company, then by the Carter Coal Company, and the final operators in Caretta were the Consolidation Coal Company.

Caretta is home to the Big Creek People in Action, an organization founded in 1990 by citizens of McDowell County in order to improve the local quality of life.  The organization also boasts partnerships with numerous colleges, churches, and other groups who volunteer in the area.

Caretta's coal mine was connected to the mine in nearby Coalwood, made famous in the book Rocket Boys.

The Carter Coal Company Store was listed on the National Register of Historic Places in 1992.

References

External links
Coalfields of the Appalachian Mountains – Caretta, WV
Big Creek People in Action

Unincorporated communities in McDowell County, West Virginia
Company towns in West Virginia
Coal towns in West Virginia
Unincorporated communities in West Virginia